Ras ben Sakka (Arabic for "Cape Ben Sakka"), the tip of Cape Angela in northern Tunisia, is the northernmost point of the African continent.

Ras ben Sakka reaches about  further north than the other.

References

Bizerte
Ben Sakka
Populated coastal places in Tunisia